The 1958–59 Czechoslovak Extraliga season was the 16th season of the Czechoslovak Extraliga, the top level of ice hockey in Czechoslovakia. 12 teams participated in the league, and TJ SONP Kladno won the championship.

Standings

External links
History of Czechoslovak ice hockey

Czech
Czechoslovak Extraliga seasons
1958 in Czechoslovak sport
1959 in Czechoslovak sport